Caloptilia ryukyuensis is a moth of the family Gracillariidae. It is known the Ryukyu Islands of Japan.

The wingspan is about 12 mm.

The larvae feed on Glochidion hongkongensis and Glochidion zeylanicum. They probably mine the leaves of their host plant.

References

ryukyuensis
Moths of Japan
Moths described in 1966